Chelonanthus is a genus of flowering plants belonging to the family Gentianaceae.

Its native range is Tropical America.

Species:

Chelonanthus hamatus 
Chelonanthus longistylus 
Chelonanthus matogrossensis 
Chelonanthus pterocaulis 
Chelonanthus purpurascens

References

Gentianaceae
Gentianaceae genera